DukeDaGod is an American rapper and record producer. He is a member of The Diplomats and the VP of A&R for Diplomat Records. He was born George Moore in Harlem, but is better known by his stage name. He released his first album  More Than Music, Vol. 1 in summer of 2005 under Diplomats/Koch Records.

Musical career
Moore got involved with the music industry when he helped form the hip-hop group Children of the Corn, composed of his childhood friends Cam'ron, Mase, Big L, and Bloodshed. Moore served as the road manager until Bloodshed's untimely death and the group disbanded. Moore had a chance to be an A&R at Roc-A-Fella Records through Dame Dash when the label first started, but Moore declined the position and later hooked up with Cam'ron once again, where he became Diplomat Records' A&R, overseeing all of the Diplomat artists' recording projects.

Moore's greatest success was with the album Dipset: The Movement Moves On, which reached #53 on the Billboard 200 in 2006.

Moore has announced that his new album D.I.P. Agenda distributed through SMG Recordings will be hitting stores November 2010, with features from Jadakiss, Hell Rell, Cam'ron, J.R. Writer and 40 cal . Any other information has not been reported

Studio albums

Compilations

References

http://www.champmag.com/2010/12/15/champ-radio-duke-da-god-interview-on-champ-radio-pt-1-talks-d-i-p-agenda/

External links
 DukeDaGod on Myspace

Rappers from New York City
Living people
Five percenters
Place of birth missing (living people)
Year of birth missing (living people)
21st-century American rappers
21st-century African-American musicians